Events in the year 1904 in Spain.

Incumbents
Monarch: Alfonso XIII
Prime Minister: Antonio Maura (until 16 December), Marcelo Azcárraga Palmero (starting 16 December)

Births

March 4 - Luis Carrero Blanco, navy officer (d. 1973)
May 11  - Salvador Dalí, artist (d. 1989)

References

 
Years of the 20th century in Spain
1900s in Spain
Spain
Spain